Christian Stebler (born 23 April 1981) is a Swiss cross-country skier. He competed in the men's 15 kilometre classical event at the 2006 Winter Olympics.

References

External links
 

1981 births
Living people
Swiss male cross-country skiers
Olympic cross-country skiers of Switzerland
Cross-country skiers at the 2006 Winter Olympics
Place of birth missing (living people)